Thomas O. Connolly (1946 – 27 July 2021) was an Irish footballer and manager who enjoyed a 40-year association as player, youth team coach, assistant manager and first-team manager with Dundalk.

Career
After starting out with Rangers in the Dundalk Minor League, Connolly joined the Dundalk youth team in the early 1960s. He made his first-team debut under Liam Tuohy in April 1970 against St Patrick's Athletic and went on to make a total of 29 appearances between 1970 and 1973. In 1975, under Jim McLaughlin, he became manager of the club's youth squad before taking charge of the Leinster youth team between 1984 and 1990. Connolly undertook his first stint as Dundalk's first-team manager in 1984. He had a further four more periods in that role, either as caretaker or joint manager, right up to 2005. Connolly's managerial services were also in demand at national level and he held the position of manager with the Irish Technical Colleges (1991), FAI U15 and U16 (1993–1995), National League U23 (1996) and the National League U20 squad (1997).

Honours

Player
Dundalk
League of Ireland Shield: 1971–72

Manager
Dundalk
League of Ireland Premier Division: 1987–88, 1990–91, 1994–95
FAI Cup: 1987–88
League of Ireland Cup: 1986–87, 1989–90

References

1946 births
2021 deaths
Association footballers from County Louth
Republic of Ireland association footballers
Association football forwards
Dundalk F.C. players
League of Ireland players
Republic of Ireland football managers
Dundalk F.C. non-playing staff
Dundalk F.C. managers
League of Ireland managers